Holodomor denial is the claim that the Holodomor, a 1932–33 man-made famine that killed millions in Soviet Ukraine, did not occur, or (especially since evidence of its existence became public in the 1980s) the diminishment of its scale and significance. Negationism of the Holodomor is distinct from the argument that it did not constitute a genocide, a claim which has been put forward by many prominent historians of the famine, such as Stephen G. Wheatcroft, Michael Ellman, and Hiroaki Kuromiya.

Officially, the government of the Soviet Union denied the occurrence of the famine and it also suppressed information about the famine from the very beginning of it until the 1980s. The Soviet government's denial of the occurrence of the famine was also circulated by some Western journalists and intellectuals. It was echoed at the time of the famine by some prominent Western journalists, including The New York Times Walter Duranty.

Holodomor denial is a form of historical negationism, and as such, it is subject to legal punishment in many countries.

Soviet Union

Cover-up of the famine 
Soviet head-of-state Mikhail Kalinin responded to Western offers of food by telling of "political cheats who offer to help the starving Ukraine," and commented, "Only the most decadent classes are capable of producing such cynical elements." In an interview with Gareth Jones in March 1933, Soviet Foreign Minister Maxim Litvinov stated, "Well, there is no famine", and went on to say: "You must take a longer view. The present hunger is temporary. In writing books you must have a longer view. It would be difficult to describe it as hunger."

On instructions from Litvinov, Boris Skvirsky, embassy counselor of the recently opened Soviet Embassy in the United States, published a letter on 3 January 1934, in response to a pamphlet about the famine. In his letter, Skvirsky stated that the idea that the Soviet government was "deliberately killing the population of Ukraine" "wholly grotesque." He claimed that the Ukrainian population had been increasing at an annual rate of 2 percent during the preceding five years and asserted that the death rate in Ukraine "was the lowest of that of any of the constituent republics composing the Soviet Union", concluding that it "was about 35 percent lower than the pre-war death rate of tsarist days."

Mention of the famine was criminalized, punishable with a five-year term in the Gulag labor camps. Blaming the authorities was punishable by death. William Henry Chamberlin was a Moscow correspondent of The Christian Science Monitor for 10 years; in 1934 he was reassigned to the Far East. After he left the Soviet Union he wrote his account of the situation in Ukraine and North Caucasus (Poltava, Bila Tserkva, and Kropotkin). Chamberlin later published a couple of books: Russia's Iron Age and The Ukraine: A Submerged Nation. He wrote in the Christian Science Monitor in 1934 that "the evidence of a large-scale famine was so overwhelming, was so unanimously confirmed by the peasants that the most 'hard-boiled' local officials could say nothing in denial."

Falsification and suppression of evidence 

The true number of dead was concealed. At the Kyiv Medical Inspectorate, for example, the actual number of corpses, 9,472, was recorded as only 3,997. The GPU was directly involved in the destruction of actual birth and death records, as well as the fabrication of false information to cover up information regarding the causes and scale of death in Ukraine.

The January 1937 census, the first in 11 years, was intended to reflect the achievements of Stalin's rule. Those collecting the data, senior statisticians with decades of experience, were arrested and executed, including three successive heads of the Soviet Central Statistical Administration. The census data itself was locked away for half a century in the Russian State Archive of the Economy.

Soviet campaign in the 1980s
The Soviet Union denied the existence of the famine until its 50th anniversary, in 1983, when the worldwide Ukrainian community coordinated famine remembrance. The Ukrainian diaspora exerted significant pressure on the media and various governments, including the United States and Canada, to raise the issue of the famine with the government of the Soviet Union.

In February 1983, Alexander Yakovlev, the Soviet Ambassador to Canada, in a secret analysis "Some thoughts regarding the advertising of the Ukrainian SSR Pavilion held at the International Exposition "Man and the world" held in Canada" put forward a prognosis for a campaign being prepared to bring international attention to the Ukrainian Holodomor which was spearheaded by the Ukrainian nationalist community. Yakovlev proposed a list of concrete proposals to "neutralise the enemy ideological actions of the Ukrainian bourgeoise nationalists".

By April 1983, the bureau of the Soviet Novosti Press Agency had prepared and sent out a special press release denying the occurrence of the 1933 famine in Ukraine. This press release was sent to every major newspaper, radio and television station as well as University in Canada. It was also sent out to all members of the Canadian parliament.

On 5 July 1983, the Soviet Embassy issued an official note of protest regarding the planned opening of a monument in memory of the victims of the Holodomor in Edmonton attempting to smear the opening of the monument.

In October 1983, the World Congress of Ukrainians led by V-Yu Danyliv attempted to launch an international tribunal to judge the facts regarding the Holodomor. At the 4th World Congress of Ukrainians held in December 1983, a resolution was passed to form such an international tribunal.

Former Ukrainian president Leonid Kravchuk recalled that he was responsible for countering the Ukrainian Diaspora's public education campaign of the 1980s, marking 50 years of the Soviet terror famine in 1983: " In the early 1980s many publications began appearing in the Western press on the occasion of the fiftieth anniversary of one of the most horrific tragedies in the history of our people. A counter-propaganda machine was put into motion, and I was one of its wheels." The first book on the famine was published in Ukraine only in 1989, after a major shake-up that occurred in the Communist Party of Ukraine when Volodymyr Ivashko replaced Volodymyr Shcherbytsky and the Political Bureau decided that such book could be published. However, even in this book, "the most terrifying photographs were not approved for print, and their number was reduced from 1,500 to around 350."

Ultimately, as President of Ukraine, Kravchuk exposed the official cover-up attempts and came out in support of recognizing the famine, named the "Holodomor", as genocide.

Denial outside the Soviet Union

Walter Duranty and The New York Times
According to Patrick Wright, Robert C. Tucker, and Eugene Lyons, one of the first Western Holodomor deniers was Walter Duranty, who won the 1932 Pulitzer prize in journalism, in the category of correspondence, for his dispatches on Soviet Union and the working out of the Five Year Plan. In 1932, he wrote in the pages of The New York Times that "any report of a famine in Russia is today an exaggeration or malignant propaganda". He said that while there was a bad harvest, and consequent food shortages, it did not rise to the level of a famine and that "there is no actual starvation or deaths from starvation, but there is widespread mortality from diseases due to malnutrition." Some have disputed the validity of his distinction between death from starvation and death from disease that is exacerbated by malnutrition.

In his reports, Duranty downplayed the impact of food shortages in Ukraine. As Duranty wrote in a dispatch from Moscow in March 1933, "These conditions are bad, but there is no famine" and "But—to put it brutally—you can't make an omelette without breaking eggs."

Duranty also wrote denunciations of those who wrote about the famine, accusing them of being reactionaries and anti-Bolshevik propagandists. In August 1933, Cardinal Theodor Innitzer of Vienna called for relief efforts, stating that the famine in Ukraine was claiming lives "likely... numbered... by the millions" and driving those still alive to infanticide and cannibalism. The New York Times, 20 August 1933, reported Innitzer's charge and published an official Soviet denial: "in the Soviet Union we have neither cannibals nor cardinals". The next day, the Times added Duranty's own denial.

British journalist Malcolm Muggeridge, who went to live in the Soviet Union in 1932 as a reporter for the Manchester Guardian and became a fierce anti-communist, said of Duranty that he "always enjoyed his company; there was something vigorous, vivacious, preposterous, about his unscrupulousness which made his persistent lying somehow absorbing." Muggeridge characterised Duranty as "the greatest liar of any journalist I have met in 50 years of journalism."  

An international campaign for the retraction of Duranty's Pulitzer Prize was launched in 2003 by the Ukrainian Canadian Civil Liberties Association and its supporters. The newspaper, however, declined to relinquish it, arguing that Duranty received the prize for a series of reports about the Soviet Union, eleven of which were published in June 1931. In 1990, the Times published an editorial calling his work "some of the worst reporting to appear in this newspaper."

By prominent visitors to the Soviet Union 
Prominent writers from Ireland and Britain who visited the Soviet Union in 1934, such as George Bernard Shaw and H. G. Wells, are also on record as denying the existence of the famine in Ukraine.

Another famine denier was Sir John Maynard. In 1934 the British Foreign Office in the House of Lords stated that there was no evidence to support the allegations against the Soviet government regarding the famine in Ukraine, based on the testimony of Maynard, who had visited Ukraine in the summer of 1933 and rejected "tales of famine-genocide propagated by the Ukrainian Nationalists".

During a visit to Ukraine carried out between 26 August – 9 September 1933, former French Prime Minister Édouard Herriot, said that Soviet Ukraine was "like a garden in full bloom". Herriot declared to the press that there was no famine in Ukraine, that he did not see any trace of it, and that this showed adversaries of the Soviet Union were spreading the rumour. "When one believes that Ukraine is devastated by famine, allow me to shrug my shoulders", he declared. The 13 September 1933 issue of Pravda was able to write that Herriot "categorically contradicted the lies of the bourgeoisie press in connection with a famine in the USSR." It was alleged by anti-communist activist Harry Lang, who claimed to have visited Ukraine at the same time, that Herriot was shown a carefully stage-managed version of Ukraine that hid effects of famine and poverty.

Douglas Tottle
In the 1980s, the union organizer and journalist Douglas Tottle with the help of Soviet authorities wrote a book alleging that the famine in Ukraine was not genocide, under the title "Fraud, Famine and Ukrainian Fascism", to be published in Soviet Ukraine. However, before final publication, reviewers of the book in Kyiv insisted that the name of the book be changed, claiming "Ukrainian fascism never existed". Tottle refused this name change, and as a result the book publication was delayed by several years.
 
In 1987, Tottle published the book in Toronto, Canada as Fraud, Famine, and Fascism: the Ukrainian Genocide Myth from Hitler to Harvard through Progress Publishers. In a review of Tottle's book in the Ukrainian Canadian Magazine, published by the Association of United Ukrainian Canadians, Wilfred Szczesny wrote: "Members of the general public who want to know about the famine, its extent and causes, and about the motives and techniques of those who would make this tragedy into something other than what it was will find Tottle's work invaluable" (The Ukrainian Canadian, April 1988, p. 24), on which historian Roman Serbyn commented that "in the era of glasnost, Szczesny could have rendered his readers no greater disservice". Some of Tottle's material appeared in a 1988 article in the Village Voice, "In Search of a Soviet Holocaust: A 55-Year-Old Famine Feeds the Right".

In 1988, the nonprofit World Congress of Free Ukrainians held an International Commission of Inquiry Into the 1932–33 Famine in Ukraine to establish whether the famine existed and its cause. Tottle's book was examined during the Brussels sitting of the commission, held between 23–27 May 1988, with testimony from various expert witnesses. The commission president Professor Jacob Sundberg claimed that Tottle received assistance from the Soviet government, based on information in the book that he felt would not be easily publicly available.

Modern politics and law

Background
The issue of the Holodomor has been a point of contention between Russia and Ukraine, as well as within Ukrainian politics. According to opinion polls, Russia has experienced an increase in pro-Stalin sentiments since the year 2000, with over half viewing Stalin favourably in 2015. Since independence, Ukrainian governments have passed a number of laws dealing with the Holodomor and the Soviet past. 

By 2009, Holodomor denial was a matter of Russian government policy and the subject of its disinformation operations. The Russian government does not recognize the famine as an act of genocide against Ukrainians, viewing it rather as a "tragedy" that affected the Soviet Union as a whole, while current Russian President Vladimir Putin denies the genocide ever happened. A 2008 letter from Russian president Dmitry Medvedev to Ukrainian president Viktor Yushchenko asserted that "the tragic events of the 1930s are being used in Ukraine in order to achieve instantaneous and conformist political goals."

Denial literature
English-language publications are catalogued according to Library of Congress Subject Headings distinguishing Holodomor denial ("works that discuss the diminution of the scale and significance of the Ukrainian Famine of 1932-1933 or the assertion that it did not occur."), and Holodomor denial literature ("Works that make such assertions").

In 2006, the All-Ukrainian Public Association Intelligentsia of Ukraine for Socialism published a pamphlet titled Mif o golodomore (The Myth of the Holodomor) by G. S. Tkachenko. The pamphlet claimed that Ukrainian nationalists and the US government were responsible for creating the "myth". Russian publicist Yuri Mukhin has published a book titled Klikushi Golodomora (Hysterical Women of the Holodomor), dismissing Holodomor as "Russophobia" and "a trump card of  the Ukrainian Nazis." Sigizmund Mironin's "Golodomor" na Rusi (The "Holodomor" in Rus') argued that the cause of the famine was not Stalin's policies, but rather the chaos engendered by the New Economic Policy.

Sputnik News, a Russian state media outlet, ran an article denying the severity and causes of the famine in Ukraine.

Laws against denial 
Ukraine's 2006  makes it illegal to publicly deny the Holodomor, recognizing it as an insult to the memory of victims and humiliation of the dignity of the Ukrainian people. 

In November 2022, Germany recognized the Holodomor as a genocide, at the same time as it amended a law to criminalize the  approval, denial, and "gross trivialization" of war crimes and instances of genocide in a new paragraph 5 of the German Criminal Code, the Strafgesetzbuch, section 130.

See also

Genocide denial
Genocide recognition politics
Holocaust denial
Holodomor genocide question
Holodomor in modern politics

References

Further reading 

Andreopoulos, George J., Ed. Genocide: conceptual and historical dimensions, Philadelphia: University of Pennsylvania Press, 1994. 
 Boriak, H. (2001). The Publication of Sources on the History of the 1932–1933 Famine-Genocide: History, Current State, and Prospects. Harvard Ukrainian Studies, 25(3/4), 167-186.
Colorosa, Barbara. Extraordinary evil: a brief history of genocide, New York: Penguin Group, 2007.  

Conquest, Robert. The Dragons of Expectation. Reality and Delusion in the Course of History, W.W. Norton and Company, 2004. 
Crowl, James William. Angels in Stalin's Paradise. Western Reporters in Soviet Russia, 1917 to 1937. A case study of Louis Fisher and Walter Duranty, University Press of America, 1982. 

 New Internationalist. Justice After Genocide. December (385). 2005.

 Mace, James. Collaboration in the suppression of the Ukrainian famine, paper delivered at a conference on "Recognition and Denial of Genocide and Mass Killing in the 20th Century", New York, 13 November 1987.
Paris, Erna. Long shadows: truth, lies, and history, New York: Bloomsbury, 2001.  
 Springer, Jane. Genocide, Toronto: Groundwood Books, 2006.  
 Sullivant, Robert S. Soviet Politics and the Ukraine: 1917-1957.  New York: Columbia University Press, 1962.
Tauger, Mark B. The 1932 Harvest and the Famine of 1933, Slavic Review, Vol. 50, No. 1 (Spring, 1991), pp. 70–89
Taylor, Sally J. Stalin's apologist: Walter Duranty, The New York Times' Man in Moscow, Oxford: Oxford University Press, 1990. 
 Totten, Samuel, William S. Parsons, and Israel W. Charney, ed. Genocide in the Twentieth Century: Critical Essays and Eyewitness Accounts. Introduction by Samuel Totten and William S. Parsons. The Garland Reference Library of Social Science, Vol. 772.  London: Garland Publishing, Inc., 1995.
Waller, James. Becoming Evil: How Ordinary People Commit Genocide and Mass Killing, Oxford: Oxford University Press, 2002.

Video resources 

 Harvest of Despair (1983), produced by the Ukrainian Canadian Research and Documentation Centre.

External links 
 Sokolova, S. (2019). Technology of Soviet Myth Creation about Famine as a Result of Crop Failure in Ukraine of the 1932–1933s. Journal of Modern Science, 42(3), 37-56.

 
Propaganda in the Soviet Union
Communist propaganda
Historical negationism
Holodomor denial
Pseudohistory
Anti-Ukrainian sentiment